Myrmecia haskinsorum is a species of ant in the genus Myrmecia. Described by Robert Taylor in 2015, the species is endemic to Australia where it is known from areas that have high elevations, although some records show the ant lives in low elevated areas in Tasmania

References

Myrmeciinae
Hymenoptera of Australia
Insects described in 2015
Insects of Australia